The Brazilian Electricity Regulatory Agency (in Portuguese, Agência Nacional de Energia Elétrica, ANEEL) is an autarchy of the government of Brazil linked to the Ministry of Mines and Energy. Its stated goal is to "provide favorable conditions for the electricity market to develop in a balanced environment amongst agents, for the benefit of society."

See also

Federal institutions of Brazil
List of regulatory organizations of Brazil

References

External links
Official website of ANEEL

Energy in Brazil
Government agencies of Brazil
Electricity authorities
Regulation in Brazil